Roihuvuori (or Roihis and Roihika, literal translation Blaze Mountain) is a quarter, part of Herttoniemi neighbourhood in Helsinki, Finland. The population of Roihuvuori is approximately 8,000 and its area is 1.47 km². There is a church, two schools, shops and restaurants in Roihuvuori. There is also a water tower, Japanese style garden, playground Tuhkimo and Kirsikkapuisto where a Hanami festival is held.

Each street in Roihuvuori was named after fairy tales, with the exception being Roihuvuori's main street (Roihuvuorentie). For example, Lumikintie is "Snow White Street" and Tuhkimotie is "Cinderella Street".